Otter Lake is a municipality in the Outaouais region, northwest of Gatineau, part of the Pontiac Regional County Municipality, Quebec, Canada.

Prior to December 20, 2003 it was known as Leslie-Clapham-et-Huddersfield and had the legal status of a united township municipality.

Geography
Population centres within the municipality include: Klukeville, Lauréat, Omer, Otter Lake, and Sandy Creek.

The village of Otter Lake is surrounded by Hughes Lake to the west, Lac de la Ferme (Farm Lake) to the east, McCuaig Lake to the south, and Lac à la Loutre (Otter Lake) to the north.

History
In 1793, Huddersfield Township was established, named after its namesake in West Yorkshire, England. In 1866, Leslie Township was established, named after James Leslie (1786-1873), a Canadian senator.

Also in 1866, the Otter Lake post office opened and the village that formed around the post office also came to have the same name. Since then, Philemon Wright, pioneer of the logging industry in Ottawa, operated a wood depot at Otter Lake. The industry has played and continues to play a leading role in the early and contemporary history of the village.

In 1877, the United Township Municipality of Leslie-Clapham-et-Huddersfield was formed from its constituent townships. While Clapham Township was not officially established until 1920, it was already planned in the second half of the 19th century and named after a village north of Bedford, England. The united municipality was established because it was more advantageous to hold a municipal status than remain unorganized territory.

In 2004 the United Township Municipality of Leslie-Clapham-et-Huddersfield became the Municipality of Otter Lake.

Demographics

Population

Language

Local government

Otter Lake forms part of the federal electoral district of Pontiac and has been represented by Sophie Chatel of the Liberal Party since 2021. Provincially, Otter Lake is part of the Pontiac electoral district and is represented by André Fortin of the Quebec Liberal Party since 2014.

List of former mayors:
 Terry G. Richard (2001–2009)
 Graham Hawley (2009–2015)
 Kim Cartier-Villeneuve (2015–2021)
 Terry Lafleur (2021-)

See also
 List of municipalities in Quebec

References

Incorporated places in Outaouais
Municipalities in Quebec